Mephisto fraserbrunneri is a species of spikefish known from the Bay of Bengal near the Andaman Islands where it has been found at a depth of .  This species is the only known member of the genus Mephisto.

References

Tetraodontiformes
Fish described in 1966